Starclimber is the third book in the Matt Cruse fantasy series, written by Canadian author Kenneth Oppel.

Plot

Matt Cruse is piloting an aerocrane for France's Celestial Tower where he narrowly survives a terrorist attack by the Babelites, a group of people who are opposed to humans reaching the heavens. After the incident, he meets with Kate de Vries, and is saddened to hear that Kate will soon return to Lionsgate City.

Canada's Minister of Air wants Canadians to be the first in space, and invites Kate to join the expedition as an expert in aerial zoology, while Matt is offered a chance to become one of the world's first astronauts on board the Starclimber. Matt decides to visit his mother and sisters. While he is there, he accepts a party invitation sent by Mr. and Mrs. de Vries. During the party, Matt is informed that Kate's parents will probably marry Kate to James Sanderson. Upon hearing this, Matt seeks out Mr. Sanderson during the party.

Matt is enrolled in the astronaut program and becomes friends with fellow astronaut trainee Tobias Blanchard. Three people are chosen to be the first astronauts, but Matt is not amongst them. When he leaves the room, Kate follows him to try and cheer him up. When she takes his hands, Matt finds an engagement ring on her finger. Matt leaves, heartbroken, and goes to a bar with the rest of the rejected astronauts-in-training. The other astronauts tell him that he deserved to be chosen. The next morning, Captain Walken tells him that one of the men they chose broke his leg, and offers Matt a spot on the space trip as a replacement. Matt accepts, even though the thought of seeing Kate again is painful.

When the crew is at zero gravity, Tobias is chosen to be the first man in space. He is enthralled by the endless vista of space in front of him and threatens to unclip his harness, provoking Matt to rescue Tobias. That evening, they discover a problem in the cable that endangers the crew. They quickly come to the conclusion that the rocket that pulled the cable up did not reach the proper altitude because of a blown fuse. The team successfully relaunches the rocket, and Matt rescues Captain Walken along the way. Later on, they discover a new creature – which Kate names "etherian" – a limbless creature having baleen that moves by ejecting bursts of air from various holes in its body and emanates light like a firefly.

During the journey, Matt discovers a letter from James Sanderson to Kate, leading him to believe that Kate really is preparing to marry James. That night, he tells Tobias his feelings for Kate, hoping that he can help him with his troubles. Tobias suggests that Matt propose to Kate. When he does, Kate attempts to change the subject, only to provoke Matt into claiming that she is lying to him about breaking off her engagement with James Sanderson.

A few days after Matt's failed proposal, the Starclimber is homebound. However, unexpected astral barnacles are discovered on the cable. The cable snaps, Shepherd is killed, and the Starclimber is left drifting in space with no way to return to the surface. The remaining members of Starclimber are left in orbit around the earth when Matt develops a crude but brilliant brainstorm using an emergency oxygen tank as a propellant and using the toilets' flush mechanisms as maneuvering jets, giving the crew only one chance to reenter the atmosphere. The beginning launch is successful, but Captain Walken is knocked unconscious, and Matt and Tobias are left as the only members of Starclimber's crew who are able to pilot her. Together with Kate and Dr. Turgenev, the four manage to guide the Starclimber into the first stage of reentry. While they are falling, Kate throws away her engagement ring and confesses her love for Matt. However, Dr. Turgenev reveals that everyone already knew, adding that it was "painfully obvious". The Starclimber, after a turbulent fall, successfully lands in Cairo.

Kate receives a telegram from her mother, saying that James Sanderson had eloped with another woman. Once Kate and Matt are alone, she apologizes to him. Matt then proposes to her again, using Sanderson's engagement ring, and she accepts, though they both know that getting Kate's parents' consent  will be difficult.

Real world inspirations 
 Evelyn Karr — after Emily Carr
 Chuck Shepherd — after Alan Shepard and Chuck Yeager

Publication history 

2008, CAN, HarperCollins , Pub date August 26, 2008, Hardback
2009, US, Eos , Pub date February 24, 2009, Hardback
2009, UK, Faber & Faber, Pub date March 2009, paperback

See also
Space elevator
Space exploration
Space Race
Martian canals

References 

 , HarperCollins (Canada) 2008; HarperCollins U.S. (Eos imprint); Faber & Faber (UK, Australia, New Zealand)

2008 Canadian novels
Canadian science fiction novels
Novels by Kenneth Oppel
Canadian steampunk novels
HarperCollins books
Children's science fiction novels
2008 science fiction novels
2008 children's books